Iolaus mafugae is a butterfly in the family Lycaenidae. It is found in Uganda (the Kigezi District) and the Democratic Republic of the Congo (Kivu). The habitat consists of montane forests.

References

Butterflies described in 1959
Iolaus (butterfly)